Aharon Solomons ( Ernest Henry Child Simpson; born 27 September 1939) is an Anglo-Israeli former Army officer, and sportsman who at one point held the Israeli national record for freediving.

Early life
Solomons is the only child of Ernest Aldrich Simpson by his third wife, Mary (née Huntemuller Kirk), formerly wife of French aviator Jacques Raffray. His father, a partner in the shipbroking firm Simpson, Spence & Young, is now most well known for being the second husband of Wallis Simpson (who later married the former King Edward VIII, becoming the Duchess of Windsor).

Solomons (Simpson by birth) was baptised at the Guards Chapel, Wellington Barracks, London.  His mother died in 1941, and his father died in 1958, the same year Ernest H.C. Simpson changed his name to Aharon Solomons, his grandfather's original surname.

Solomons spent his early childhood between the United Kingdom and India, then with friends of his father in Pennsylvania, United States. Returning to Britain in 1946, he was educated at Westbourne House School in Sussex, before attending Harrow School and then Le Rosey in Switzerland.

Career
In 1957, Solomons was commissioned in the British Army joining his father's regiment, the Coldstream Guards, before being seconded to the Intelligence Corps and served in the Middle East.

Following his father's death in 1958, he learned of his Jewish heritage and decided to move to Israel, later announcing that he had suddenly felt he belonged somewhere: "I had always felt neither English nor American. But I could become Israeli". In 1962, he emigrated to Israel joining the Israeli Army and seeing action during the Six-Day War in 1967 then on the Golan Heights front during the Yom Kippur War of 1973.

In 1960, Solomons married first Joy Corisande Jackson (25 April 1932 – 22 September 2010); they had two sons, Uri (b. 1964) and Nadav (b. 1965). They lived for ten years on various kibbutzim and then at Rosh Pinna. From 1975, he travelled in the Sinai, Greece, Micronesia and Mexico, where he lived alone for a while, before becoming a scuba diving instructor in Eilat for several years. In 1992, he met Francisco Ferreras "Pipin", and trained with him in Cuba in the "no limits" and "constant weight" disciplines of freediving.

Solomons married second Maria-Teresa "MT" Solomons in 1997, having a son, Ze'ev (b. 1998). The Solomons are currently separated but work and train together with the Association Internationale pour le Développement de l'Apnée.  He and his wife were members of the Israeli freediving team at Ibiza in 2001 and MT Solomons represented Great Britain at Egypt in 2008. Both are A.I.D.A Instructor Trainers and teach in Israel, the Turks and Caicos, Greece as well as in Mexico.

Marcus Greatwood, one of Aharon's students, quotes Aharon's ideology as the foundation of his system of freediving.

See also
Ernest Aldrich Simpson

References

External links
 AIDA International
 Freedivers.net
 Freedivers.co.il

1939 births
Living people
People educated at Harrow School
Alumni of Institut Le Rosey
Coldstream Guards officers
Israeli military personnel
British freedivers
Israeli sportsmen